A partial lunar eclipse occurred on the 16 and 17 July 2019. The Moon was covered 65.31% by the Earth's umbral shadow at maximum eclipse.

This was the last umbral lunar eclipse until May 2021.

Visibility 
It was visible over most of Asia, Australia, Africa, Europe, and South America.

Gallery

Related eclipses

Tzolkinex 
 Preceded: Lunar eclipse of 4 June, 2012

 Followed: Lunar eclipse of 28 August 2026

Tritos 
 Preceded: Lunar eclipse of 16 August 2008

 Followed: Lunar eclipse of 15 June 2030

Inex 
 Preceded: Lunar eclipse of 6 August 1990

 Followed: Lunar eclipse of 26 June 2048

Triad 
 Preceded: Lunar eclipse of 14 September 1932

 Followed: Lunar eclipse of 17 May 2106

Eclipses of 2019 
 A partial solar eclipse on 6 January.
 A total lunar eclipse on 21 January.
 A total solar eclipse on 2 July.
 A partial lunar eclipse on 16 July.
 An annular solar eclipse on 26 December.

Lunar year series

Saros cycle

Half-Saros cycle
A lunar eclipse will be preceded and followed by solar eclipses by 9 years and 5.5 days (a half saros). This lunar eclipse is related to two total solar eclipses of Solar Saros 146.

See also 
 List of lunar eclipses and List of 21st-century lunar eclipses

References

External links 
  Partial Lunar Eclipse 2019
 Saros cycle 139
 Hermit eclipse: 2019-07-16
 

2019-07
2019 in science
July 2019 events